Horace James Taylor (26 November 1895 – 13 October 1961) was an English cricketer who played for Kent County Cricket Club.

Taylor was born at Sevenoaks in Kent in 1895. He made his debut in first-class cricket for Kent against Warwickshire at Edgbaston in the 1922 County Championship. He made a total of 12 First XI appearances for Kent, his last coming in 1925 although he continued to play for the Second XI in the Minor Counties Championship until 1928.

Taylor studied at Wye College, an agricultural college in Kent, and worked in Africa for the Colonial Office during the 1930s, playing some cricket in Kenya and Nigeria before the Second World War. He died at Tunbridge Wells in Kent in October 1961 aged 65.

References

External links

1895 births
1961 deaths
People from Sevenoaks
English cricketers
Kent cricketers
Alumni of Wye College